Lustenau is a town in the westernmost Austrian state of Vorarlberg in the district of Dornbirn. It lies on the river Rhine, which forms the border with Switzerland. Lustenau is Vorarlberg's fourth largest town.

Geography

Lustenau is located on the eastern bank of the Alpine Rhine, in the lower Vorarlberg Rhine Valley, which serves as the border with the Canton of St. Gallen, Switzerland. Its altitude is 404 meters above sea level. Because the town is located at the bottom of the Rhine Valley, there are no hills or mountains.
Lustenau is bordered to the west by the Rhine and to the northeast by the Dornbirner Ach. The territory stretches about 8.5 km from north to south, and about 4 km from east to west.

Four bridges connect Lustenau with Switzerland. The municipality is organised into four parishes, on which locals often refer to: Rotkreuz, Rheindorf, Kirchdorf and Hasenfeld.

As the church square in Lustenau is painted in blue, the village center is called "Blue Square" (German Blauer Platz).

History
The name Lustenau derives from a document from January 24 887, signed by the Carolingian king Charles the Fat, with the title "Lustenauua curti regali," meaning "Royal Court of Lustenau." In 1395 the Counts of Werdenberg pledged the Zwingenstein fortress and Lustenau to the Knights of Ems, and in 1526 the pledge was converted into a final purchase. After the male line of the Hohenems family died out in 1759, a decade-long dispute over ownership of Lustenau developed between Maria Theresa of Austria on the one hand and the Hohenems heiress Maria Rebekka on the other. Until 1830, Lustenau was an independent county ruled over by the Counts of Waldburg-Zeil-Lustenau-Hohenems. After 1830 it became part of Austria. During the German Reich, there is no evidence of any organized resistance against National Socialism in Lustenau. However, a large number of cases of individual opposition are documented, which were punished with arrests, with the delivery to a concentration camp or even with the death penalty. After the Second World War, local embroidery industry gave Lustenau an economic boom.

Population
The first census took place in 1750 and resulted in 1073 inhabitants. During large periods of its history, the municipality of Lustenau experienced much higher population growth than the average for Vorarlberg. In particular, the strong economic growth that began with the flourishing embroidery industry and the elimination of the flood problem at the end of the 19th century led to a strong migration movement to Lustenau, both from other municipalities in Vorarlberg and from the rest of Austria and southern Germany. A second wave of immigration in the 1950s and 1960s was triggered by the renewed strong economic upswing after the Second World War.

Special Characteristics
Due to its special political position as the Royal Court, Lustenau was comparatively isolated from its surroundings for centuries. It was not until 1837 that foreign men were accepted as citizens. Because of this, a distinctive dialect has developed and been preserved in Lustenau, which is recognizably different from the other Alemannic dialects of the surrounding area.

Another consequence of Lustenau's centuries of independence is the dominance of a few family names, like "Hämmerle", "Grabherr" and "Bösch".  The 1998 inhabitants counted in 1806 were distributed among only 19 family names, which were still born by 60% of the population in 1950. It is due to this circumstance that the use of house names from the 17th century until the late 20th century was even more pronounced in Lustenau than in the rest of Vorarlberg.

Regular Events
Every Summer, since more than 30 years, the culture and youth association "Szene Lustenau" organizes an open-air festival at the Rhine bank, called Szene Openair, the largest festival in Western Austria. The Event hosts international Artists, as like local bands and attracts over 10.000 visitors from all over Austria, Germany, Switzerland and Liechtenstein. More than 450 volunteers work for the festival.

The Kilbi, the parish fair of the parish St. Peter and Paul, is the largest fair in Vorarlberg. Every year on the 2nd Sunday in October, around 160 market stalls offer their goods at the church square. A temporary amusement park is being set up for the Kilbi on the village square, with roller coasters, carousels, shooting ranges and many more. On the Saturday before the Kilbi, a party is organised called "Kilbifest"

Transport 

Lustenau lies on the section of the Vorarlberg Railway running between St. Margrethen in Switzerland and Bregenz. It is also home to the headquarters of the International Rhine Regulation Railway, a historic industrial railway that was formerly used in the development dikes and extension of the Rhine out into the Lake of Constance.

Sport
Lustenau has a long and successful history in sports. The town's two football teams, SC Austria Lustenau and FC Lustenau, play in major Austrian football leagues. The well-known and successful skier, Marc Girardelli, was born in Lustenau, and the Lustenau ice-hockey team, EHC Lustenau, is part of the Austrian National League. FC Lustenau 07 and SC Austria Lustenau played in the Austrian Football First League in the 2007-08 and 2008-09 seasons.

The town was formerly a major center of the embroidery industry in the past and is now a centre for the new technologies industry

There are also two very good athletics and gymnastic clubs in Lustenau, the TS (Turnerschaft) Lustenau and the TS (Turnerschaft) Jahn Lustenau. Both have achieved top results nationally and internationally. They also have survived the domination of the football clubs, which led to a total demolition of the athletic track in the Reichshofstadion in 1998.

Notable people

 Manfred Schurti (born in 1941), Liechtenstein racing driver
 Fredmund Malik (born in 1944), economist
 Marc Girardelli (born in 1963), skier
 Markus Peintner (born in 1980), ice hockey player
 René Swette (born in 1988), ice hockey player
 Barbara Gasser (born in 1989), gymnast

References

External links
Market Community of Lustenau

Cities and towns in Dornbirn District
Austria–Switzerland border crossings